Faymann government may refer to two government cabinets in Austria:

 the First Faymann government (2008–2013)
 the Second Faymann government (2013–2016)